Magdiel Gutiérrez (born 14 April 1968) is a Nicaraguan wrestler. He competed in the men's freestyle 100 kg at the 1992 Summer Olympics.

References

1968 births
Living people
Nicaraguan male sport wrestlers
Olympic wrestlers of Nicaragua
Wrestlers at the 1992 Summer Olympics
Sportspeople from Managua